Ralph Ernest Urban (March 29, 1875 – May 19, 1935) was suffragan bishop of the Episcopal Diocese of New Jersey.

Biography 
He was born in Mount Hope, Lancaster County, Pennsylvania. After studies at Princeton University and the General Theological Seminary, he was ordained deacon in 1899 and priest in 1900. He was rector of All Saints Church, Trenton, New Jersey from 1900 to 1931. He then became the first Dean of Trinity Cathedral and was also elected suffragan bishop of New Jersey on June 15, 1932, and consecrated on November 11, 1932.

References
 Obituary in The Living Church, May 25, 1935, p. 664.

1875 births
1935 deaths
People from Lancaster County, Pennsylvania
Princeton University alumni
General Theological Seminary alumni
Episcopal bishops of New Jersey